Tolidostena japonica is a beetle in the genus Tolidostena of the family Mordellidae. It was described in 1953 by Tokeji.

Subspecies
Tolidostena japonica fusei (Tokeji, 1953)
Tolidostena japonica japonica (Tokeji, 1953)

References

Mordellidae
Beetles described in 1953